Anthela angiana is a moth of the Anthelidae family. It is found in New Guinea.

References

Moths described in 1915
Anthelidae